Tylopeza zelotypa is a species of moth of the family Tortricidae. It is found in Colombia.

References

Moths described in 1912
Euliini